The Tour of Marmara is an international road cycling race organized by the Turkish Cycling Federation at towns in eastern Marmara Region of Turkey. It is part of the UCI Europe Tour having a rating of 2.2.

It was first held in 2010 between October 28–31, at which 70 racers of ten international teams competed in four categories.

  (Şile - Kefken)
  (Kefken - Akçakoca)
  (Akçakoca - Adapazarı)
  (Adapazarı - Kocaeli)

Winners

2012 cancelled

References

Marmara
Recurring sporting events established in 2010
2010 establishments in Turkey
Sport in Istanbul
Sport in Düzce
Sport in Sakarya Province
Sport in İzmit
UCI Europe Tour races
Autumn events in Turkey